The Houston Mayoral Election of 1997 took place on November 4, 1997 to elect the successor to term limited Mayor Bob Lanier. With no candidate receiving a majority of the votes, a run-off was held on December 6, 1997. The ultimate result was Lee Brown winning the election. The election was officially non-partisan.

Candidates

Former Director of the National Drug Control Policy Lee Brown
Robert Mosbacher
George Greanias
Gracie Saenz
Helen Huey
Richard Barry
Jeane-Claude Lanau
Brenard Calkins

Results

1997 in Houston
1997 Texas elections
Houston
1997
Non-partisan elections
November 1997 events in the United States